Théophile Carbon (24 July 1895 – 28 October 1951) was a French equestrian. He competed at the 1920 Summer Olympics and the 1924 Summer Olympics.

References

1895 births
1951 deaths
French male equestrians
Olympic equestrians of France
Equestrians at the 1920 Summer Olympics
Equestrians at the 1924 Summer Olympics
Sportspeople from Aisne